Events from the year 1188 in Ireland.

Incumbent
Lord: John

Births

Deaths
Melaghlin Ua Madadhan, King of Síol Anmchadha